This is a list of the candidates of the 2023 New South Wales state election, which will be held on 25 March 2023.

Retiring MPs
The following members have announced they are not contesting the upcoming election:

Labor
Walt Secord MLC – announced 19 August 2022
Adam Searle MLC – lost preselection 15 September 2022
Shaoquett Moselmane MLC – did not nominate for endorsement
Guy Zangari MP (Fairfield) – announced 17 October 2022
Paul Lynch MP (Liverpool) – not preselected November 2022
Nick Lalich MP (Cabramatta) – announced 24 December 2022

Liberal
Shelley Hancock MP (South Coast) – announced 18 December 2021
Gabrielle Upton MP (Vaucluse) – announced 6 July 2022
Kevin Conolly MP (Riverstone) – announced 15 August 2022
Victor Dominello MP (Ryde) – announced 17 August 2022
Geoff Lee MP (Parramatta) – announced 22 August 2022
Jonathan O'Dea MP (Davidson) – announced 6 September 2022
Rob Stokes MP (Pittwater) – announced 30 September 2022
David Elliott MP (Baulkham Hills) – announced 22 October 2022
Brad Hazzard  MP (Wakehurst) – announced 24 October 2022
Matthew Mason-Cox MLC – not preselected 22 December 2022
Lou Amato MLC – not preselected 22 December 2022
Shayne Mallard MLC – not preselected 22 December 2022
Peter Poulos MLC – disendorsed 18 February 2023
Scott Farlow MLC – not preselected

Nationals
Stephen Bromhead MP (Myall Lakes) – announced 17 August 2022
Chris Gulaptis MP (Clarence) – announced 22 August 2022
Melinda Pavey MP (Oxley) – announced 28 August 2022

Independent
Justin Field MLC – announced 17 October 2022
John Sidoti MP (Drummoyne) – announced 24 November 2022

Other 	
Jamie Parker MP (Balmain, Greens) – announced 14 October 2022
Mark Pearson MLC (Animal Justice Party)

Legislative Assembly
Sitting members are shown in bold text.  The candidates have been derived from the NSW Electoral Commission website.

Legislative Council
Sitting members are shown in bold text. 

Half of the Legislative Council is not up for re-election. This includes seven Labor members (Tara Moriarty, Penny Sharpe, Greg Donnelly, Anthony D'Adam, Daniel Mookhey, Peter Primrose, Mark Buttigieg), five Liberal members (Damien Tudehope, Taylor Martin, Natalie Ward, Natasha Maclaren-Jones and Aileen MacDonald), three Nationals members (Sarah Mitchell, Wes Fang and Sam Farraway), two Greens members (Abigail Boyd and Sue Higginson), two One Nation members (Mark Latham and Rod Roberts), one Shooters and Fishers member (Mark Banasiak) and one Animal Justice member (Emma Hurst).

The Labor Party is defending seven seats. The Liberal Party is defending six seats. The National Party is defending three seats. The Greens, the Shooters, Fishers and Farmers Party and the Animal Justice Party are each defending one seat. Independent Fred Nile, elected as a Christian Democratic member, is defending his seat and independent Justin Field, elected as a Greens member, is not defending his seat.

Disendorsements and resignations

Notes

References

2023 elections in Australia
Candidates for New South Wales state elections
March 2023 events in Australia